Radio Romance may refer to:

 Radio Romance (album), eighth studio album by American country artist Eddie Rabbitt
 "Radio Romance" (song), by Tiffany Darwish
 Radio Romance (TV series), a 2018 South Korean television series
 Radio Romance, the former name of the former broadcasting network and now new media MOR Entertainment from 1989–1993